Lake Lohja (Lohja järv) is a lake of Estonia.

See also
List of lakes of Estonia

Lohja
Kuusalu Parish
Lohja